The Fighting Frontiersman is a 1946 American Western film directed by Derwin Abrahams and written by Ed Earl Repp. The film stars Charles Starrett, Helen Mowery, Hank Newman and Smiley Burnette. The film was released on December 10, 1946, by Columbia Pictures.

Plot

After stumbling upon a large cache of gold in Texas, prospector Cimarron Dobbs (Emmett Lynn) is wary of being swindled out of his fortunate fortune. The gold was left behind by Santa Anna's army, and Dobbs needs help. Dobbs heads out to the local town of Twin Forks, where he hopes his friend, saloon girl Dixie King (Helen Mowery) will help him. When he shows King a sample of his find he is unaware that saloon owner John Munro (Robert Filmer) is taking notice. King tell Dobbs that he should seek the help of Steve Reynolds (Charles Starrett), aka the mysterious rider, the Durango Kid. Monroe's shady gang kidnap Dobbs, intent on torturing the location of the gold from him. King contacts the Durango Kid, who heads to town with his trusty sidekick Smiley (Smiley Burnette). The Durango Kid disguise comes out, Smiley does some sleuthing, and a barroom brawl breaks out.

Monroe blindfolds and drags King to the hideout Dobbs is being held, hoping she will draw out the information he wants when he promises her half the gold. Dobbs distrusts her, so she offers to prove her honorable intentions by returning with the Durango Kidd's Ranger star to gain his trust. Meanwhile Reynolds already suspects that Monroe is up to no good, and offers a $5000.00 reward, and promises to share the wealth with the town for information on the gang's hideout. Back at the hideout, King is again blindfolded and taken back to town; but, all the while secretly leaving a trail of beads for the Durango Kid. The "Kid" finds his way to the lair, rescues the damsel and Dobbs, and defeats the bad guys in a gun battle.

Cast          
Charles Starrett as Steve Reynolds / The Durango Kid
Helen Mowery as Dixie King
Hank Newman as Hank Newman
Smiley Burnette as Smiley Burnette
Emmett Lynn as Cimarron Dobbs
Robert Filmer as John Munro
George Chesebro as Rankin
Zon Murray as Slade
Jim Diehl as Blaze
Maudie Prickett as Kate
Russell Meeker as Bartender
Frank Ellis as Guard
Ernie Adams as Printer
Frank LaRue as Roberts
Jock Mahoney as Waco

References

External links
 
 

1946 films
American Western (genre) films
1946 Western (genre) films
Columbia Pictures films
Films directed by Derwin Abrahams
American black-and-white films
1940s English-language films
1940s American films